Monmouthshire Libraries are a collection of six libraries in Monmouthshire, Wales owned by Monmouthshire County Council. The libraries are located in Abergavenny (a Grade II listed Carnegie library), Gilwern, Monmouth (located in The Rolls Hall), Usk, Caldicot and Chepstow.

In the context of the Monmouthpedia project, an initiative designed equip the town with hundreds of links to Wikipedia for smart-phone users, Monmouth Library has become the first library in the world to add QR codes to books. Users with smart phones can now instantly find Wikipedia articles on a book and its author. Priority has been given to local literature and Welsh titles but recent acquisitions on the Queen's Jubilee and the Olympics have also been QR coded.

In addition to the six libraries in Monmouthshire, a mobile library service called Reaching Out is available.

References

External links 
 Reaching Out Library Service

Libraries in Wales
Libraries